"A Thousand Words Before Friday" is the 13th episode in the second season, and the 36th episode overall, of the American dramedy series Ugly Betty, which aired on January 24, 2008. The episode was written by Henry Alonso Myers and Sheila Lawrence, and directed by Matt Shakman.

Plot
Betty learns that an author she's been assigned to write an article on actually writes books on picking up women. Daniel dates a woman who happens to be Wilhelmina's sister. Amanda and Marc believe that they might have finally found Amanda's biological father: Gene Simmons.

Production
Freddie Rodriguez had been signed to do 12 shows but was not sure about what would happen with Gio even though he became a fan favorite, while Gabrielle Union, who began her first stint in this episode as Renee, was uncertain about whether she would be a semi-regular and prior to the strike was supposed to make more appearances during the second season.

Reception
There were some mixed responses from this episode. Some thought that, despite a great storyline, it lacked the edge that the characters have on the show.

Ratings
The episode pulled in a 6.2/10, but like the previous two episodes, this one also placed second behind Fox's Are You Smarter Than a 5th Grader?

References

Also starring
Freddy Rodriguez as Giovanni "Gio" Rossi
Gabrielle Union as Renee Slater

Guest stars
Paul Hipp as Phil Roth 
Gene Simmons as himself

Ugly Betty (season 2) episodes
2008 American television episodes
Television episodes directed by Matt Shakman